The 2023 New Jersey State Senate election will be held on November 7, 2023. New Jersey voters will elect state senators in all of the state's legislative districts for a four-year term to the New Jersey Senate.

Incumbents not running for re-election

Democratic
Sandra Bolden Cunningham, District 31
Fred H. Madden, District 4
Nicholas Sacco, District 32 (redistricted into District 33)
Samuel D. Thompson, District 12 (previously elected as a Republican)

Republican
Christopher J. Connors, District 9
Steve Oroho, District 24
Jean Stanfield, District 8

References

2023
Senate
New Jersey Senate